Vladimir G. Dubrovskii  (born in 1965) is the head of Laboratory of physics of nanostructures at St. Petersburg Academic University, a leading research scientist at Ioffe Institute, and a professor at St. Petersburg State University and ITMO University.

Educational background 

Dubrovskii graduated from St. Petersburg State University, Department of Statistical Physics, in 1988, with a diploma in theoretical physics. In 1991, he was a post-doc research fellow in Oxford University. He obtained his PhD in 1990 and a doctor of sciences degree in 2002, in condensed matter physics.

Contributions to physics 

Dubrovskii has made contributions to several fields of physics. 
Semiconductor nanostructures and nanowires
He is best known for growth modeling of semiconductor nanostructures, particularly III-V nanowires.  Starting from 2003, he has been at the forefront of research in this field, collaborating with more than 40 groups in 18 countries (with joint publications). His main area is in kinetically controlled engineering of nanostructures, including morphology, crustal phase, and size distributions. In 2005, he and coauthors proved a diffusion-induced character of gold-assisted vapor-liquid-solid (VLS) growth of GaAs nanowires by molecular beam epitaxy [1]. In 2008-2014, following Frank Glas [2], he developed theoretical approaches for understanding and controlling polytypism of III-V nanowires by the growth parameter tuning [3] and catalyst material [4]. This allowed achieving record small GaAs nanowires (down to 5 nm in radius) with pure zincblende structure [5]. Independently of Jerry Tersoff [6], in 2013-2015 he predicted a non-linear focusing effect [7,8] that enabled self-organized ensembles of GaAs nanowires with uniform radii [8]. The works of 2016 brought up the new size distributions describing length statistics in nanowire ensembles [9,10]. In 2015-2016, he developed the first theory for the compositional control of ternary III-V nanowires [11], sharpening their axial heterointerfaces [12] and, more generally, nucleation theory of ternary solids from ternary and quaternary liquid alloys. He contributed into understanding the VLS versus selective area growth of nanowires [13] and self-induced nucleation of GaN nanowires on silicon substrates [14].

Classical nucleation theory
In 2009, Dubrovskii discovered fluctuation-induced broadening (the Dubrovskii broadening) of the size distributions described by a Fokker-Planck type kinetic equation in terms of the Kuni invariant variables [15], and presented a map of the power exponents for the spectrum spreading in 2D and 3D systems. Further studies revealed the influence of kinetic fluctuations on the size distributions of islands and droplets in the stages of their nucleation, growth, and Ostwald ripening [16,17]. He also contributed into binary nucleation theory with a saddle point of the formation energy, with applications in growth theory of strain-induced islands [18] and ternary VLS nanowires. 
            
Statistical size distributions and scaling properties
In 1996, he published exact solution for the infinite set of rate equations for heterogeneous growth with size-linear rate constants [19], reduced to one-parametric Polya distribution. Further investigation of the growth systems with size-linear capture rates led to a two-parametric modified beta-distribution (2015) [20] which acquires the Vicsek-Family scaling form [21] in the continuum limit. Distributions of this type are now widely used for modeling the growth kinetics of semiconductor nanostructures, surface islands and biological objects.
        
Self-regulated nucleation and growth in nanosystems
Since 2004, Dubrovskii pursued growth theories in confined systems with a limited amount of growth species in the mother phase. He developed concepts of “mononuclear” growth [22,23] whereby individual nucleation events predetermine physical properties of emerging nanomaterials. He developed methods of using different size-dependent effects for narrowing size distributions [8,24-26]. 
Together with Frank Glas, he predicted narrow sub-Poissonian size distributions [27] in systems with nucleation antibunching [28], and derived analytical asymptotes for their time-independent shapes.  
     
Elastic relaxation and plastic deformation in nanostructures
He and coauthors developed semi-analytical models for elastic relaxation and misfit dislocations in nanostructures grown on lattice-mismatched substrates [29] and contributed into development of epitaxial techniques for monolithic integration of high quality optical III-V nanostructures with silicon electronic platform [8,18,30].

Research style
Dubrovskii prefers analytical calculations to computers and tries to present theoretical models for complex growth behavior in a simple analytic form with a minimum number of physically transparent parameters.

Current research interests 
Dubrovskii main areas are currently in modeling and shaping of sophisticated nanowire nanoheterostructures, nucleation theory in the nanoscale, physical chemistry of alloys and compounds, and analytic size distributions. He is working with experimentalists on design and functionalization of optoelectronic nanoheterostructures.
Lecture courses and PhD students
Dubrovskii is lecturing in nucleation theory, epitaxy of nanostructures and growth modeling of nanowires. He has supervised 10 PhD students, 2 of them under European Marie Curie Initial Training Networks.

Books and book chapters 
V. G. Dubrovskii, Growth kinetics of epitaxial nanostructures, Fizmatlit, Moscow (2009) (in Russian).
V. G. Dubrovskii, Nucleation theory and growth of nanostructures. Springer, Heidelberg – New York – Dordrecht – London, 2014.
V. G. Dubrovskii, Theory of VLS growth of compound semiconductors. In: A. Fontcuberta i Morral, S. A. Dayeh and C. Jagadish, editors, Semiconductors and Semimetals, v. 93, Burlington: Academic Press, 2015, pp. 1–78.

Articles
[1] 
[2] 
[3] 
[4] 
[5] 
[6] 
[7] 
[8] 
[9] 
[10] 
[11] 
[12] 
[13] 
[14] 
[15] 
[16] 
[17] 
[18] 
[19] 
[20] 
[21] 
[22] 
[23] 
[24] 
[25]  
[26] 
[27] F. Glas and V. G. Dubrovskii, Phys. Rev. B, submitted (2017).
[28] 
[29] 
[30]

Appointments and memberships 
Semiconductor Science and Technology journal, member of Editorial board (since 2017)
Nanomaterials and Nanotechnology journal, member of Editorial board (since 2016)
Technical Physics Letters, member of Editorial board (since 2011) 
International Nano-Optoelectronic Workshop, member of Steering Committee (since 2010)
Nanowire Week, member of Steering Committee (since 2011)
Euro MBE conference, member of International Program Committee (since 2017)
International symposium “Nanostructures: Physics and Technology”, member of International Program Committee (since 2008)
French-Russian associated international laboratory “Nanostructures of Compound Semiconductors: Growth, Properties, Devices”, Russian scientist-in-charge.
Zh. I. Alferov Russian-Chinese joint laboratory of information optoelectronics and nanoheterostructures, Deputy director (from 2010).

Publication record 
Dubrovskii has authored and co-authored more than 600 research papers in leading technical journals and conferences, with more than 250 journal papers indexed by WoS. His Hirsh-index is 40 (WoS).

Honors 
Chevalier of Ordre des Palmes académiques, France (2017). 
Guest professor at Clermont Université, Clermont-Ferrand, France (2014). 
Regular high-level visiting scientist in the International Guest Academic Talents (IGAT) Base at Beijing University of Posts and Telecommunications, China (2007-2016).
Distinguished Visiting Fellow of the Royal Academy of Engineering, Durham University, UK (2010).

References 

1965 births
Living people
Russian physicists
Saint Petersburg State University alumni